Adam Ross is a fictional character on the television series CSI: NY. He is portrayed by A. J. Buckley.

Background
He makes his first appearance in season two, helping out in the Audio Visual department (episode 208, "Bad Beat"). However, his skills are rather eclectic and diverse: Adam also works with trace evidence and has the qualifications and master's degree necessary to run a PCR DNA test to check for the presence of HIV (episode 320, "What Schemes May Come"). He even occasionally accompanies the field operatives to the crime scene in order to aid evidence collection or to assist in reconstruction.

Originally from Phoenix, Arizona, he claims that temperatures below 85 degrees Fahrenheit are cold, and he dislikes snow (episode 313, "Obsession"). While observing a suspect on video, he recognizes her instinctual flinch as shying from an anticipated blow. He admits that "[his] father was a bully," indicating that Adam may have been abused as a child (episode 315, "Some Buried Bones"). This might explain to some degree his rather characteristic nervousness around figures of authority, such as Supervisors Mac Taylor and Stella Bonasera, despite Adam's wide-ranging scientific knowledge and high qualifications for his job. Taylor forcefully admonishes Adam in front of Stella after the younger man gave key information regarding a case to Deputy Inspector Gerrard (played by Carmen Argenziano), instead of calling Mac down directly. Adam is deeply hurt by his rebuke, but later is instrumental in saving the life of the next victim of the same serial killer, thanks to his knowledge of a specific hotel where his uncle used to work (and where the victim is being held captive in the basement). He also knew the hotel from awesome tricks battles he took part in. In the same episode, he also gives Stella the wonderful news that she is HIV-negative after performing the PCR-DNA test for her (episode 321, "Past Imperfect"). He previously dated a SuicideGirl according to episode 305, "Oedipus Hex," much to the surprise of colleague Danny Messer. He invested in so much of the digital generation, he didn't know what Mac Taylor meant when asked to develop a victim's roll of film (episode 614, "Sanguine Love").

He is shown to be rather sensitive, becoming visibly teary when interrogating a young child with obsessive-compulsive disorder who had murdered his verbally abusive father ("The Party's Over") and letting the child have his iPod. This event may have also affected Adam because he may have been abused, verbally or physically as a child (episode 315, "Some Buried Bones"). There are also some indications in this episode that Adam may have OCD himself, hinted at when the boy asks Adam why he knows so much about OCD - Adam says, "some of it's science" and Mac and Stella share knowing smiles. He is a fan of Guitar Hero, citing the game as one of the things that would possibly cheer him up after that particular case.

As was explained in episode 801 "Indelible", on the tenth anniversary of the September 11 attacks, Ross confides to Lindsay Messer that he slept through the terrorist attacks of the day. He says he was out late at night at a club with friends and arrived home so late in the morning that when he finally awoke, the Pentagon was on fire and the World Trade Center was already destroyed. Ross then volunteered at Ground Zero in the subsequent cleanup and also help to rescue any survivors. Messer informed Ross that she too was working as part of the cleanup crew suggesting the pair possibly met before their employment at the crime lab.

On the job
After a successful raid on a warehouse, Adam is left alone with two uniformed officers to process the scene when Mac escorts the captured cocaine to the lab for analysis. Some Irish mobsters, in a plot to recover their drugs, take Adam and the two cops hostage. They torture Adam, forcing him to reveal information about the lab, and take his personal ID badge to facilitate access. When Danny Messer arrives at the warehouse to assist Adam with the crime scene, they take him captive, as well, despite Adam's attempt to call out a warning. Adam, at Danny's direction, bravely and quietly recovers a caustic chemical from his field kit as Danny distracts their captors. Danny later uses the chemical to disable one of their captors. Adam himself saves the lives of the two (formerly uniformed) cops, who were gagged with duct tape and disguised as the hostage-takers, when Detective Flack and his men storm the warehouse (episode 324, "Snow Day").

As the fourth season begins, ten days later in the series continuity, Adam is shown waking up on the floor while fellow lab tech Kendall Novak is asleep on the couch. The two seem to have a competitiveness at work (episode 401, "Can You Hear Me Now?").

Also in season four, in the episode, "Down the Rabbit Hole", Adam shows a vast knowledge of online MMORPG games, in particular, SecondLife. When a vic is found dead in a doll warehouse dressed strangely, Adam is the CSI who realizes that the victim is dressed as an on-line avatar from SecondLife (A game Adam plays)

In the season five episode "Enough," Adam receives a letter that his job will be terminated within one month. He is greatly relieved when he finds out it is not Mac's doing, but instead due to budget cuts. Mac angrily calls Chief Sinclair to try to save his job, and Stella organizes her fellow CSIs to give up paid vacation to give Adam some more time. This storyline is currently ongoing.

In The Party's Over, Adam is called to help Hawkes process a scene after Danny backs out. When the victim's son goes missing, Adam finds him in hiding and forges something of a bond with him, letting him borrow Adam's iPod briefly. Later, the boy shows up at the police station to wait for Adam, who has found evidence on the iPod connecting the boy to the murder. It is revealed that he killed his father and wants to confess, but will only talk to Adam, who is called in to help question the boy. Upon learning of the boy's reasons for committing the murder, Adam is sympathetic and understanding, but the boy's plight seems to remind Adam of his own childhood, and is seen crying while letting the boy have his iPod.

In Episode 17 "Green Peace", Adam is injured during a game of street hockey when a car bomb goes off. The investigation leads to an environmental terrorist group.

In the season 6 premiere, "Epilogue", Adam and Stella Bonasera have a one-night stand. They discuss it a few days later and decide to not repeat it.

In the episode "Unfriendly Chat", Adam witnesses a murder on the internet, leaving him determined to find the murderer. He states he could illegally hack the murderer's laptop and activate the webcam, showing them what he looks like, but Mac doesn't allow it. He goes through with it, anyway and is caught by Jo, who tells Mac. The murderer tracks down Adam and tries to run him over, but he dodges and fights. When the murderer shoots at Mac, Adam hits him with a light tube. Mac suspends him for three days (for the hacking). Later Danny and Sheldon make fun of his "lightsaber" battle and also state that Mac went easy on him (Danny: "He could've suspended you from the flagpole.").

In season 9 episode 10 (The Real McCoy), Adam has his day off and he visits his father, who has Alzheimer's disease. Adam tries to help him, but he makes him angry and sad, because he can't remember the times when he bullied Adam and Adam's mother. Adam wants him to apologize and take responsibility for his actions. Later on Adam's father disappears and ends up in the police station.

CSI: NY characters
Fictional characters from Arizona
Fictional characters with obsessive–compulsive disorder
Fictional forensic scientists
Fictional New York City Police Department detectives
Fictional victims of domestic abuse
Television characters introduced in 2005